Dearborn Station (also referred to as Polk Street Depot) was, beginning in the late 1800s, one of six intercity train stations serving downtown Chicago, Illinois. It remained in operation until May 1, 1971.  Built in 1883, it is located at Dearborn and Polk Streets, adjacent to Printers Row. The station was owned by the Chicago & Western Indiana Railroad, which itself was owned by the companies operating over its line. The station is now a shopping mall housing office, retail, and entertainment spaces.

Description and history

The Romanesque Revival structure, designed by Cyrus L. W. Eidlitz, opened in 1885 at a cost of $400 to $500 thousand (equivalent to $ to $ million in ). The three-story building's exterior walls and twelve-story clock tower were composed of pink granite and red pressed brick topped by a number of steeply-pitched roofs. Modifications to the structure following a fire in 1922 included eliminating the original pitched roof profile. Behind the head house were the train platforms, shielded by a large train shed. Inside the station were ticket counters, waiting rooms, and Fred Harvey Company restaurants.

Amtrak (the National Railroad Passenger Corporation) chose to consolidate its Chicago operations at the Union Station. The final intercity passenger train to depart Dearborn Station was the Grand Trunk Western Railroad's International Limited, which departed on April 30, 1971. The arrival of the Atchison, Topeka & Santa Fe Railway's San Francisco Chief and Grand Canyon from California on May 2 brought intercity operations at Dearborn to a close. The Norfolk & Western Railway's Orland Park commuter service, the Orland Park Cannonball, continued to use a platform at Dearborn until 1976.

By 1976, Dearborn Station's train shed was demolished and tracks were removed; the head house building was retained. The train station stood abandoned into the mid-1980s when it was converted to retail and office space. The former rail yards were converted for use as Dearborn Park.

Services

Some of the railroad that served the station include the following, with some of the more well-known name trains listed:

 Atchison, Topeka and Santa Fe Railway (Santa Fe) – the Chief, Super Chief, El Capitan, and Grand Canyon Limited (to name but a few) to Los Angeles, California; the Texas Chief to Galveston/Houston, Texas; the Antelope to Oklahoma City, Oklahoma; the Kansas Cityan (and its eastbound counterpart, the Chicagoan) to Kansas City, Missouri; and the San Francisco Chief to San Francisco, California. Although the Santa Fe by far operated the greatest number of trains from the station, it was only a tenant.
 Chesapeake and Ohio Railway (moved to the Grand Central Station February 28, 1925).
 Chicago and Eastern Illinois Railroad – Cardinal, Zipper and Silent Knight to St. Louis, Missouri; Dixie Flyer, and Dixie Flagler and Georgian to Evansville, continuing to Nashville, Tennessee, then Atlanta, Georgia, and finally Miami, Florida (The Georgian ending at Atlanta). From July 31, 1904 to August 1, 1913, Chicago & Eastern Illinois trains used LaSalle Street Station.
 Chicago, Indianapolis and Louisville Railway (Monon) – Hoosier and Tippecanoe to Indianapolis, Indiana, Thoroughbred to Louisville, Kentucky.
 Erie Railroad (Erie Lackawanna Railway from 1960) – Atlantic Express and Pacific Express, Erie Limited, Phoebe Snow and Lake Cities to Hoboken, or Jersey City, New Jersey.
 Grand Trunk Western Railroad – Maple Leaf, Inter-City Limited and International Limited to Toronto, Ontario and Montreal, Quebec. Mohawk to Detroit, Michigan.
 Wabash Railroad (Norfolk and Western Railway from 1964) – Blue Bird and Banner Blue to St. Louis, Missouri.

The following commuter rail services also operated from the station:
 Chicago and Eastern Illinois Railroad (until 1935) – operated from Dearborn Station to Crete, Illinois. Metra is planning to revive the route as its SouthEast Service.
 Chicago and Western Indiana Railroad (until 1964) – operated between Dearborn Station and Dolton, Illinois serving mostly local stops within Chicago's far south side.
 Chicago and Erie Railroad – operated from Dearborn Station to Rochester, Indiana.
 Grand Trunk Western Railroad (until 1935) – operated from Dearborn Station to Valparaiso, Indiana (later service was cut-back to Harvey, Illinois).
 Wabash Railroad (Norfolk and Western Railway from 1964) – used a track west of the station until 1976, when moved to the Union Station); now Metra's SouthWest Service.
 Santa Fe Railway (until 1903) operated from Dearborn Station to Joliet, Illinois.

In popular culture
In blues musician Henry Thomas' 1927 song "Railroadin' Some", the "Polk Street Depot" is the next to last stop on a journey that begins in Fort Worth, Texas, and ends in Chicago.

Dearborn Station is mentioned multiple times in the 1974 "Adam's Ribs" episode of M*A*S*H, in which Hawkeye Pierce craves the barbecued ribs from a fictional restaurant adjacent to the station, but can't recall the name. He calls the station master from South Korea to get the restaurant's name and phone number.  He incorrectly calls it the "Dearborn Street Station".

"Dearborn Station" is a song by the rock band Fortune that was released in 1985.

Photo Gallery

See also
 Architecture of Chicago
 Printer's Row, Chicago
 South Loop
 Chicago Union Station
 Central Station (Chicago terminal)
 Great Central Station

References

External links

Dearborn Street Station (Fred Harvey Exhibit)
Dearborn Station Directory

Property Valuation Map of Dearborn Station in 1953 (Requires DjVu plugin)
1885 Railroad Chronology

Former railway stations in Illinois
Railway stations on the National Register of Historic Places in Illinois
Buildings and structures on the National Register of Historic Places in Chicago
Railway stations in Chicago
Chicago Landmarks
Historic American Engineering Record in Chicago
Chicago
Chicago
Chicago and Eastern Illinois Railroad
Chicago and Western Indiana Railroad
Chicago
Chicago
Chicago
Chicago
Clock towers in Illinois
Romanesque Revival architecture in Illinois
Railway stations in the United States opened in 1885
Railway stations closed in 1971
1885 establishments in Illinois